Duane Emerson Couey (September 13, 1924 – March 26, 2004) was an American leader in the Reorganized Church of Jesus Christ of Latter Day Saints (RLDS Church). Couey was a member of the church's Council of Twelve Apostles and First Presidency and also served a term as the church's Presiding Patriarch.

Couey was born and raised in Milwaukee, Wisconsin. He was in the United States Navy during World War II, serving as a Petty Officer First Class Radioman aboard the destroyer escort Earl K Olson. After the war, he briefly worked as a manager in a plastics plant in Milwaukee, Wisconsin before becoming a missionary for the RLDS Church, becoming a full-time RLDS Church minister in 1954.  He was president of the Los Angeles, California Stake from 1958 to 1960.

On 2 April 1960, Couey was selected by RLDS Church president W. Wallace Smith to become an apostle of the church and a member of the Council of Twelve Apostles. At this time, he moved to Independence, Missouri, where the headquarters of the RLDS Church were located. Couey served in the Council of Twelve Apostles until 1966, when Smith selected him to replace the retiring F. Henry Edwards as one of Smith's counselors in the First Presidency of the church.

When W. Wallace Smith retired and was succeeded by his son Wallace B. Smith in 1978, Wallace B. Smith selected Couey and Howard S. Sheehy, Jr. to be his counselors in the new First Presidency. In 1982, Couey was released in the First Presidency and was succeeded by Alan D. Tyree. At this time, Couey was appointed by Smith to succeed Reed M. Homes as the Presiding Patriarch of the RLDS Church. In April 1992, Couey was released from this calling and retired from full-time ecclesiastical service. He was succeeded in this position by Paul W. Booth.

Couey was regarded for his abilities as a theologian, minister, and administrator.  He was an enthusiastic mentor to many of the younger church appointees.

Couey was married to Edith Griswold of Madison, Wisconsin in 1947, having two children, Patricia Louise, born in Milwaukee in 1952, and Ralph Floyd, born in 1955 in Paris, Tennessee.  Patricia became an expert in the field of learning disabilities.  Ralph is an intelligence analyst with the U.S. Department of Justice.  Edith died of cancer in 1982.  Couey was remarried to Margaret Rushing of Paris, Tennessee in 1987.  Margaret died, also from cancer, in 2003.

Couey died in Independence, Missouri at age 79.

Notes

References
"Obituary: Duane E. Couey": Obits For Life 2011
 

1924 births
2004 deaths
American leaders of the Community of Christ
American Latter Day Saint missionaries
Apostles of the Community of Christ
Community of Christ missionaries
Members of the First Presidency (Community of Christ)
Presiding Evangelists of the Community of Christ
People from Independence, Missouri
Doctrine and Covenants people
Religious leaders from Milwaukee
Latter Day Saint missionaries in the United States